The 2013–14 Loyola Marymount Lions women's basketball team represented Loyola Marymount University in the 2013–14 college basketball season. The Lions, members of the West Coast Conference, were led by head coach Charity Elliott, in her 2nd season at the school. The Lions played their home games at the Gersten Pavilion on the university campus in Los Angeles, California.

Before the Season
Chris Elliott, husband of Charity Elliott, became a full-time assistant for the 2013–14 season after replacing Tracy Wolff midway through the 2012–13 season. Meanwhile, Kiva Herman was hired as a new assistant coach after Jackie Stiles moved on to Missouri State University as an assistant head coach.

Roster

Schedule
Source:

|-
!colspan=12 style="background:#00345B; color:#8E0028;"| Exhibition

|-
!colspan=12 style="background:#8E0028; color:#00345B;"| Regular Season

|-
!colspan=12 style="background:#00345B; color:#8E0028;"| 2014 West Coast Conference women's basketball tournament

Game Summaries

Exhibition: Cal State San Bernardino

New Mexico

Utah State

New Mexico State

Oregon State

Long Beach State

UC Irvine

Montana

Colorado State

Northern Arizona

UNLV

Seattle

BYU
Series History: BYU leads series 6-1
Broadcasters: Spencer Linton and Kristen Kozlowski

San Diego
Series History: San Diego leads 38-27

San Francisco
Series History: Loyola Marymount leads 33-31

Santa Clara
Series History: Santa Clara leads 43-20

Pepperdine
Series History: Pepperdine leads 50-18
Broadcaster: Josh Perigo

Pacific
Series History: Pacific leads series 1-0
Broadcasters: Don Gubbins and Alex Sanchez

Saint Mary's
Series History: Saint Mary's leads 39-16

Gonzaga
Series History: Gonzaga leads 34-22

Portland
Series History: Loyola Marymount leads 34-22

Pepperdine
Series History: Pepperdine leads 50-19

Portland
Series History: Loyola Marymount leads 35-22

Gonzaga
Series History: Gonzaga leads 35-22
Broadcasters: Greg Heister and Stephanie Hawk Freeman

Saint Mary's
Series History: Saint Mary's leads 40-16

Pacific
Series History: Pacific leads series 2-0

San Diego
Series History: San Diego leads 39-27

BYU
Series History: BYU leads series 7-1

Santa Clara
Series History: Santa Clara leads 44-20

Rankings

See also
Loyola Marymount Lions women's basketball

References

Loyola Marymount Lions women's basketball seasons
Loyola Marymount